Teymurabad (also Romanized as Teymūrābād) is a village in Yusefvand Rural District, in the Central District of Selseleh County, Lorestan Province, Iran. At the 2006 census, its population was 51, in 13 families.

References 

Towns and villages in Selseleh County